Péter Takács may refer to:

 Péter Takács (footballer) (born 1990), Hungarian footballer
 Péter Takács (fencer born 1956), Hungarian fencer
 Péter Takács (fencer born 1973), Hungarian fencer